The Fidget Cube is a small hand-held device designed by Matthew and Mark McLachlan, brothers and co-founders of the Colorado-based design studio Antsy Labs. It has fidget tools on all sides: a switch, gears, a rolling ball (marble), a joystick, a spinning disk, a worry stone, and five buttons.

Reception 
In a positive review, The Verge described the cube as "basically a baby toy for adults".

After its 2016 Kickstarter campaign, the Fidget Cube ranked tenth on the highest-funded crowdfunding projects.

See also
 Fidgeting
 Fidget spinner
 Stress ball
 Worry beads
 Infinity Cube

References 

Kickstarter-funded products
2010s fads and trends
Mechanical toys
Sensory toys